Rebeldes is the debut studio album by Brazilian pop group Rebeldes, originating from the Brazilian telenovela Rebel Rio. Released on September 23, 2011 by EMI and Record Entretenimento with recording and production of Rick Bonadio and composition of the own Bonadio, Di Ferrero, Cris Morena, Gee Rocha and Eric Silva, the work has fifteen tracks. The album reached 3rd place on the ABPD - receiving a gold record certification for over 40,000 copies sold and soon after the certification of the platinum record certification for reaching the mark of 80,000 copies. The Record Entretenimento confirmed in total, 220,000 copies sold of the disc. The album was number 12 in the best selling albums in Brazil in 2011.

Do Jeito Que Eu Sou was the first single to be officially released from the album, coming in 21st in the Billboard Brasil Hot 100 and 17th in Billboard Brasil Hot Pop, the song was released on July 29, 2011 and your music video was released in December of the same year. Quando Estou do Seu Lado was the second single from the album released only in digital format and reached the position 45 on Billboard Brasil Hot 100 being the second track of the band to reach the Top 50 on Billboard Brasil Hot 100. In June 2012 the band announced the release of the third single from the album Rebeldes called Depois da Chuva, the music video contains scenes from the first DVD of the band Rebeldes - Ao vivo.

Track listing

References 

2011 debut albums
EMI Records albums
Albums produced by Rick Bonadio